Uday Shankar (8 December 1900 – 26 September 1977) was an Indian dancer and choreographer, best known for creating a fusion style of dance, adapting European theatrical techniques to Indian classical dance, imbued with elements of Indian classical, folk, and tribal dance, which he later popularised in India, Europe, and the United States in 1920s and 1930s. He was a pioneer of modern dance in India.

In 1962, he was awarded by Sangeet Natak Akademi, India's The National Academy for Music, Dance and Drama, with its highest award, the Sangeet Natak Akademi Fellowship for lifetime achievement, and in 1971, the Govt. of India, awarded him its second highest civilian award the Padma Vibhushan.

Early life and education
Uday Shankar Chowdhury was born in Udaipur, Rajasthan, the eldest son of an Brahmin family with origins in Narail (present day Bangladesh). His father Shyam Shankar Chowdhury, a noted barrister, was employed with the Maharaja of Jhalawar in Rajasthan at the time of his eldest son's birth, and his mother Hemangini Devi was descended from a zamindari family. His father was granted the title, 'Harchowdhury' by the Maharajas, but he preferred to use the surname 'Chowdhury' minus 'Har.' Uday's younger brothers were Rajendra Shankar, Debendra Shankar, Bhupendra Shankar and Ravi Shankar. Of his siblings, Bhupendra died young in 1926.

Uday Shankar's father was a Sanskrit scholar, who graduated with honours from the University of Calcutta and later studied at Oxford University, where he became a Doctor of Philosophy. Because his father moved frequently on account of his work, the family spent much time in Uday's maternal uncle's house at Nasratpur with his mother and brothers. Uday's studies also took place at various locations including Nasratpur, Gazipur, Varanasi, and Jhalawar. At his Gazipur school, he learnt music and photography from Ambika Charan Mukhopaddhay, his Drawing and Crafts teacher.

In 1918, at the age of eighteen, he was sent to Mumbai to train at the J. J. School of Art and then to Gandharva Mahavidyalaya. By now, Shyam Shankar had resigned his post in Jhalawar and moved to London. Here he married an English woman and practised law, before becoming an amateur impresario, introducing Indian dance and music to Britain. Subsequently, Uday joined his father in London, and on 23 August 1920, joined the Royal College of Art, London to study painting under Sir William Rothenstein. He danced at a few charity performances that his father had organized in London, and on one such occasion, noted Russian ballerina Anna Pavlova happened to be present. This was to have a lasting impact on his career.

Career

Uday Shankar did not have any formal training in any of the Indian classical dance forms. Nevertheless, his presentations were creative. From a young age, he had been exposed to both Indian classical dance and folk dance, as well as to ballet during his stay in Europe. He decided to bring elements of both the styles together to create a new dance, which he called Hi-dance. He went on to translate classical Indian dance forms and their iconography to dance movements, after studying the Rajput painting and Mughal painting styles at the British Museum. Further, during his stay in Britain, he came across several performing artists, subsequently when he left for Rome on the 'Prix de Rome' scholarship of French Government, for advanced studies in art.

Soon his interaction with such artists grew and so did the idea to transform Indian dance into a contemporary form. The turning point came with his first meetings with legendary Russian ballerina Anna Pavlova. She was looking for artists to collaborate on India-based themes. This led to the creation of ballets based on Hindu themes, 'Radha-Krishna', a duet with Anna, and 'Hindu Wedding', for inclusion in her production, 'Oriental Impressions'. The ballet was presented at the Royal Opera House, Covent Garden, in London. Later he continued to conceive and choreograph ballets, including one based on the Ajanta Caves frescoes, which was performed across the United States. In time his style of dance came to be known as 'Hi-dance', though later he called it 'Creative dance'.

He worked with Anna for one and a half years, before starting out on his own in Paris.

Shankar returned to India in 1927, along with a French pianist, Simon Barbiere, who was now his disciple and dance partner, and a Swiss sculptress, Alice Boner, who wanted to study Indian art history. He was welcomed by Rabindranath Tagore himself, who also persuaded him to open a performing arts school in India.

On his return to Paris in 1931, he founded Europe's first Indian dance company, along with Alice Boner, who by now had become one of his disciples. Together with musicians Vishnu Dass Shirali and Timir Baran, he created a new template for music to accompany his newly devised movements. His first series of dance performances were held on 3 March 1931, at the Champs-Elysees Theatre in Paris, which was to become his base as he toured through Europe.

Soon he embarked on a seven-year tour through Europe and America with his own troupe, which he called – 'Uday Shankar and his Hindu Ballet', under the ageis of impresario Sol Hurok and Celebrity Series of Boston of impresario, Aaron Richmond. He performed in the United States for the first time in January 1933 in New York City, along with his dance partner Simkie, a French dancer. As part of the visit, a reception was held at the Grand Central Art Galleries. After, Shankar and his troupe set out on an 84-city tour throughout the country.

His adaptation of European theatrical techniques to Indian dance made his art hugely popular both in India and abroad, and he is rightly credited for ushering in a new era for traditional Indian temple dances, which until then had been known for their strict interpretations, and which were also going through their own revival. Meanwhile, his brother Ravi Shankar was helping to popularise Indian classical music in the outside world.

In 1936, he was invited by Leonard Knight Elmhirst, who had earlier assisted Rabindranath Tagore in building Sriniketan, close to Shanti Niketan, to visit Dartington Hall, Totnes, Devon for a six-month residency, with his troupe and lead dancer, Simkie. Also present there were Michel Chekhov, nephew of Russian playwright Anton Chekhov, the German modern dancer-choreographer, Kurt Jooss and another German Rudolf Laban, who had invented a system of dance notation. This experience only added more exuberance to his expressionist dance.

In 1938, he made India his base, and established the 'Uday Shankar India Cultural Centre', at Simtola, 3 km from Almora, in Uttarakhand Himalayas, and invited Sankaran Namboodri for Kathakali, Kandappa Pillai for Bharatanatyam, Ambi Singh for Manipuri and Ustad Allauddin Khan for music. Soon, he had a large assemblage of artists and dancers, including Guru Dutt, Shanti Bardhan, Simkie, Amala, Satyavati, Narendra Sharma, Ruma Guha Thakurta, Prabhat Ganguly, Zohra Sehgal, Uzra, Lakshmi Shankar, Shanta Gandhi; his own brothers Rajendra, Debendra and Ravi also joined him as students.  The centre, however, closed after four years in 1942, due to a paucity of funds. As his students dispersed, he regrouped his energies and headed South, where he made his only film, Kalpana (Imagination) in 1948, based on his dance, in which both he and his wife Amala Shankar danced. The film was produced and shot at Gemini Studios, Madras. In 2008, the film was digitally restored by the Cineteca di Bologna, in association with The Film Foundation’s World Cinema Project  and the National Film Archive of India, among others.

Uday Shankar settled in Ballygunge, Kolkata in 1960, where the "Uday Shankar Center for Dance" was opened in 1965. In 1962, he was awarded the highest award of the Sangeet Natak Akademi, the Sangeet Natak Akademi Fellowship for his lifetime contribution to Indian dance.

Personal life
Uday is the elder brother of Ravi Shankar. He married his dance partner, Amala Shankar, and together they had a son, Ananda Shankar, born in 1942, and a daughter, Mamata Shankar, born in 1955. Ananda Shankar became a musician and composer who trained with Dr. Lalmani Misra rather than with his uncle, Ravi Shankar, and in time became known for his fusion music, encompassing both European and Indian music styles. Mamata Shankar, a dancer like her parents, became a noted actress, working in films by Satyajit Ray and Mrinal Sen. She also runs the 'Udayan Dance Company' in Kolkata, and travels extensively through the world.

Legacy

Uday (b. 1900, d. 1977) and Amala Shankar (b. 1919, d. 2020) decided to open Uday Shankar India Culture Centre (named after Uday Shankar's Almora centre for dance) in Kolkata in 1965, where Amala Shankar remained the Director-in-Charge, from the day of its inception. Shankar's pedagogical structure was followed and developed in this school with Amala Shankar successfully running the school and the dance troupe for next 50 years. The school continued until 2015, remaining dedicated to carrying on with Shankar's ideas about processes of innovative and creative dance making. Uday Shankar India Culture Centre continued to offer training in classical dances (Kathakali) throughout the 50 years, Bharata Natyam (from beginning until 1977 and again from 1995 – 2009), Manipuri (for the first 8 years), Kathak (from 1977 until 2015), Odissi ( for 5 years) and offered training in Uday Shankar's creative processes involving observation, innovation, improvisation. 
As a tribute to Uday Shankar, and to consolidate his legacy, Amala Shankar worked hard to present to the world – choreographs of Shankar, as well as new innovations created with help of Guru P. Raghavan (Kathakali Guru at the centre for 45 years), and her team of dedicated and wonderful musicians. The performing troupe of Uday Shankar India Culture Centre toured widely through the world and within India, with the support of Government of India and private funding bodies. The legacy created by Uday Shankar's genius and Amala Shankar's excellent ability as a teacher, remains in the hands of the next generations of wonderful dancers both Uday Shankar and Amala Shankar trained – as an organic process, hopes to generate healthy minds and bodies of creative thinkers and dancers engaged in empowering more and more people through dance. 
Amala Shankar recreated major productions and dances of Uday Shankar, such as Samanya Kshati, Mahamanav – shadow play, Labour and Machinery (Full length dance productions).
She re-staged Shankar's choreographies of dances like Snanam, Village Festival, Kartikeya, Astra Puja, Raas Leela, and many others.
She created new Performance Choreographies – Seeta Swayamvara, Yuga Chanda (with the choreographic idea and musical composition of her son, the world renowned musician/composer Ananda Shankar), Vasavadutta, Chidambara (with poems of poet Sumitra Nandan Panth composed as songs by Rabin Das), Chitrangada, Kal Mrigaya. Following Shankar's idea of art as and for complete education, Amala Shankar insisted on overall development of dancers and the students were taught costume and stage design, besides movement creation processes and choreography. She was awarded the Padma Bhushan in 1991. She is a living legend at 99 years. who took as her life's mission, propagation of Shankar's work and pedagogical process.

Ananda Shankar's wife, Tanushree Shankar, continues to teach and perform his style of Indian modern dance, through the 'Tanushree Shankar Dance Company', also based in the city. Uday Shankar's legacy is also being carried forward by his daughter Mamata Shankar through her institution 'Udayan Kala Kendra'. In March 2017, Mamata Shankar made a claim through social media, which stated that her school is "the one and only dance institution in the world to teach the authentic Uday Shankar style of dance". This claim was publicly refuted by Ananda Shankar's daughter, Sreenanda Shankar, who stated, "Uday Shankar belongs to the world and lots of people are teaching it beautifully and teaching it right". Years after his school at Almora was disbanded, his followers and associates continued to spread his innovative style of dancing and his aesthetic through their own work. Many went on to form their own companies, thus creating an everlasting legacy of his immense body of work and influence on the dancers of his generation. Among them is Shanti Bardhan, who has created Ramayana ballets presentations using human beings performing like puppets, while also introducing the Panchatantra tales into dances by creating movements of birds and the animals. Onkar Mullick, who was one of his main dancers in the troupe. Guru Dutt, who attended his school, went on to become one of India's finest film directors. Another student, Lakshmi Shankar, later changed careers and became a noted classical singer, who later married Rajendra Shankar, the younger brother of Uday Shankar. Zohra Sehgal made a career for herself in stage, television, and the cinema both in India and in Britain. Satyavati later danced with Ram Gopal at The Royal Festival Hall in London and at the Edinburgh festival in 1956. She taught Indian dance to thousands of young girls in Bombay through her classes in several of the convent schools in the city during a teaching career that spanned more than four decades.

In December 1983, his younger brother, sitar player Ravi Shankar organised a four-day festival, Uday-Ustav Festival in New Delhi, marking the 60th anniversary of his professional debut in 1923, highlighted by performances by his disciples, films, an exhibition and orchestral music composed and orchestrated by Ravi Shankar himself. The centenary celebrations of his birth were formally launched at the UNESCO headquarters in Paris on 26 April 2001, where dancers, choreographers and scholars from all over the world assembled to pay homage to Uday Shankar.In the Tollygunge area of south Kolkata, the Golf Club road has been renamed to Uday Shankar Sarani.

Awards
 1960: Sangeet Natak Akademi Award – 'Creative Dance'
 1962: Sangeet Natak Akademi Fellowship
 1971: Padma Vibhushan
 1975: Desikottama, Visva-Bharati University

See also
 List of dancers

Selected discography 
The Original Uday Shankar Company of Hindu Musicians, Recorded During the Historic 1937 Visit to the United States, instrumental ensemble: Vishnudass Shirala, Sisir Sovan, Rabindra (Ravi Shankar), Dulal Sen, Nagen Dey, Brijo Behari 
Indian Music: Ragas and Dances, The Original Uday Shankar Company of Hindu Musicians. Recorded during the historic 1937 visit to the United States. RCA/Victrola VIC-1361 (1968 reissue, 10 tracks: 4 ragas, 5 dances, 1 bhajan)
Ravi Shankar: Flowers of India El Records (2007), containing all tracks from the original album

Further reading
 Uday Shankar and his art, by Projesh Banerji. Published by B.R. Pub. Corp., 1982.
 His Dance, His Life: A Portrait of Uday Shankar, by Mohan Khokar. Published by Himalayan Books, 1983.
 Uday Shankar, by Paschimbanga Rajya Sangeet Akademi. Published by West Bengal State Sangeet Academy, Information & Cultural Affairs Dept., Govt. of West Bengal, 2000.
 Uday Shankar, by Ashoke Kumar Mukhopadhyay. 2008. .
 Honoring Uday Shankar, by Fernau Hall. Dance Chronicle, Volume 7, Issue 3 1983, pages 326 – 344.
  Uday Shankar’s Short Biography 1900–1977 , A.H. Jaffor Ullah
  Who Remembers Uday Shankar?, Prof. Joan L. Erdman
  Uday Shankar―the choreographer par excellence: A pictorial view, A.H. Jaffor Ullah
  Uday Shankar Troupe's 1937 Recordings of Indian Ragas, A.H. Jaffor Ullah

References

28. Sarkar Munsi, Urmimala (2011). 'Imag(in)ing The Nation: Uday Shankar's Kalpana' in Traversing Traditions: Celebrating Dance in India. Eds. Urmimala Sarkar Munsi & Stephanie Burridge. Routledge: India, UK, USA. pp. 124–150.

29. Sarkar Munsi, Urmimala (2010). 'Boundaries and Beyond: Problems of Nomenclature in Indian Dance' in Dance: Transcending Borders. Ed. Urmimala Sarkar Munsi. Tulika Books: Delhi. pp. 78–98.

External links

 Uday Shankar―the choreographer par excellence: A pictorial view
 Celebrating Creativity: Life & Work of Uday Shankar at IGNCA

1900 births
1977 deaths
Alumni of the Royal College of Art
Bengali male artists
Indian choreographers
Indian male dancers
People from Udaipur
Recipients of the Padma Vibhushan in arts
Recipients of the Sangeet Natak Akademi Award
Recipients of the Sangeet Natak Akademi Fellowship
Sir Jamsetjee Jeejebhoy School of Art alumni
Dancers from Rajasthan
20th-century Indian dancers